Teresio Faustino Centurión Sosa (born 3 October 1958) is a former football midfielder and coach.

Career
Centurión started his career in Sol de América in 1976 until 1989, with a 3-month spell at club Capitán Figari in 1981. He also played for other Paraguayan clubs until 1992 where he ended his career playing for Humaitá. Centurión became a symbol for Sol de América where he spent the majority of his career, obtaining the first championship for the club in 1986 and several second-place finishes (1978, 1979, 1981, 1988).

As a coach, he managed several teams from Atyrá, Limpio and Guarambaré; as well as Silvio Pettirossi and the youth divisions of Sol de América.

Titles

References

1958 births
Living people
Sportspeople from Asunción
Paraguayan footballers
Club Sol de América footballers
Paraguayan football managers
Association football midfielders